The Egyptian Journal of Forensic Sciences is a peer reviewed open access scientific journal covering forensic sciences published by Springer Nature and is an official publication of the International Association of Law and Forensic Sciences. The journal was established in January 2011 and until 2016 published by Elsevier. All issues pertaining to this period are available through ScienceDirect. Since January 2017, the journal is published by SpringerOpen. The editor-in-chief is Magdy Kharoshah.

Abstracting and indexing
The journal is abstracted and indexed in Scopus.

References

External links

English-language journals
Forensic science journals
Publications established in 2011
Springer Science+Business Media academic journals
Open access journals
Continuous journals